The 2021 London ePrix (formally the 2021 Heineken London E-Prix) was a pair of Formula E electric car races held in and around the ExCeL London centre in the Royal Docks area of the London borough of Newham on 24 and 25 July 2021. The circuit is designed as an indoor-outdoor venue, combining the ExCeL facilities and the surrounding public roads at the Royal Victoria Dock. It marked the twelfth and thirteenth rounds of the 2020–21 Formula E season, as well as the third running of the event, and the first since it was last held in 2016 at Battersea Park.

The first race was won by Jake Dennis, with Nyck de Vries and Alex Lynn rounding out the podium. Alex Lynn took his maiden Formula E victory in the second race, finishing ahead of Nyck de Vries and Mitch Evans, as original race winner Lucas di Grassi was disqualified for failing to serve a drive-through penalty.

This result left 18 drivers in contention for the World Championship coming into the final two races of the season at Berlin.

Classification

Race one

Qualifying

Race

Notes:
  – Pole position.
  – Fastest in group stage.
  – Fastest lap.
  – Robin Frijns received a 5-second time penalty for pushing another car into the wall and gaining a position.
  – Maximilian Günther received a 10-second time penalty for causing a collision.
  – Norman Nato pulled into the pit lane at the end of the final lap after exceeding the maximum energy usage. As he did not cross the chequered flag, he was not classified.
  – Sébastien Buemi and Oliver Rowland originally finished 4th and 10th respectively, but were disqualified from the race for exceeding the maximum energy usage.

Race two

Qualifying

Race

Notes:
  – Fastest in group stage.
  – Fastest lap.
  – Pole position.
  – Stoffel Vandoorne received a 5-second time penalty for overtaking under yellow flag conditions.
  – Oliver Rowland received a 5-second time penalty for causing a collision.
  – Lucas di Grassi originally finished 1st, but was disqualified from the race for failing to respect a drive-through penalty. He had received the penalty for a safety car procedure infringement.

Notes

References

|- style="text-align:center"
|width="35%"|Previous race:2021 New York City ePrix
|width="30%"|FIA Formula E World Championship2020–21 season
|width="35%"|Next race:2021 Berlin ePrix
|- style="text-align:center"
|width="35%"|Previous race:2016 London ePrix
|width="30%"|London ePrix
|width="35%"|Next race:2022 London ePrix
|- style="text-align:center"

2021
2020–21 Formula E season
2021 in British motorsport
July 2021 sports events in the United Kingdom